The Pacte Progressista (Pacte), officially the Pacte Progressista d'Eivissa, was an electoral alliance formed in Ibiza by the Socialist Party of the Balearic Islands, United Left of Ibiza, The Greens of Ibiza, Entesa Nacionalista i Ecologista and Republican Left of Catalonia to contest the 1999 and 2003 regional elections. Previously, it had contested the 1996 Senate election in both Ibiza and Formentera as Eivissa i Formentera al Senat, and it would also contest the 2000 Senate election as the Pacte per Eivissa i Formentera.

Background
Ahead of the 1996 general election, Ibiza and Formentera only elected one senator to the Spanish Cortes. The disunity of the nationalist and left-of-centre forces always meant that the senator was won by right-of-centre parties. As a result, the Pact was meant as a unitary candidacy of all left parties, obtaining a great electoral success by winning the senator from the People's Party.

Composition

References

Political parties in the Balearic Islands
Defunct political party alliances in Spain
Political parties established in 1996
Political parties disestablished in 2006